Mark George Miller (born August 13, 1956) is a former American football quarterback. He played with the Cleveland Browns (1978–1979) before being traded in August 1980 to the Green Bay Packers, where he saw no action. He was released by the Packers before the 1981 season. Miller then briefly resurfaced with the Michigan Panthers of the United States Football League in 1983.

Miller had put together a solid college career with Bowling Green State University (1974–1977), resulting in the Browns making him a third round selection in the 1978 NFL Draft. During his brief career his role was that of a backup quarterback, consequently making his playing time limited. He attempted 47 passes, completed 15 for only 243 yards, seeing the most action in the 1978 regular season finale against the Cincinnati Bengals after replacing an injured Brian Sipe.

References

1956 births
Living people
Players of American football from Canton, Ohio
American football quarterbacks
Bowling Green Falcons football players
Cleveland Browns players
Green Bay Packers players
Michigan Panthers players